Tony Adam (born 18 January 1986) is a German diver. He competed in the 2004 Summer Olympics.

References

1986 births
Living people
Divers from Dresden
People from Bezirk Dresden
Divers at the 2004 Summer Olympics
German male divers
Olympic divers of Germany
21st-century German people